Putting It Over is a lost 1919 American silent comedy film directed by Donald Crisp and starring Bryant Washburn. The film was produced by Famous Players-Lasky with distribution being handled by Paramount Pictures.

Plot
As described in a film magazine, Buddy (Washburn) works in a drug store mixing soda waters for $12 a week. By calling his landlady "Dearie" and making love to her daughter, he is allowed certain liberties around his boarding house. He falls in love with a stenographer and in a moment of confidence proposes to her, and she accepts. He tells her that he makes $50 a week. A cut in the workforce at the drug store finds him without a job. He is also ejected from his room, and spends the night in the park. During the long hours of the night he evolves a scheme which the drug store puts into practice, and he soon has a position at his old firm paying $50 a week. On the day he accepts the job offer the wedding bells ring out.

Cast
Bryant Washburn as Robert "Buddy" Marsh
Shirley Mason as Mary Stacey
Adele Farrington as Mrs. Peeler
Winifred Greenwood as Miss June Peeler
Casson Ferguson as Perkins
Clarence Geldart as Mr. Hard (credited as C.H. Geldert)
Edward Alexander as Percival
Robert Dunbar as Chilton
Guy Oliver as Policeman
Edna Mae Cooper

References

External links
 

Glass slide

1919 films
Lost American films
American silent feature films
Films directed by Donald Crisp
Paramount Pictures films
1919 comedy films
American black-and-white films
Silent American comedy films
1919 lost films
Lost comedy films
1910s American films